Sir William Edward Maxwell,  (5 August 1846 – 14 December 1897) was a British colonial official who served as Colonial Secretary of the Straits Settlements and Governor of the Gold Coast, then a British colony.

Early days
Born on 5 August 1846, William Edward Maxwell was the son of Sir Peter Benson Maxwell, the Chief Justice of the Straits Settlements.

Career

Straits Settlements
Maxwell followed his father into the legal profession, and also served in the courts of the Straits Settlements.

In 1883, Maxwell was appointed the Commissioner of Land Titles in the Straits Settlements, to be a Member of the Executive and Legislative Councils of those Settlements.
In 1889, he was appointed the Resident of Selangor. He became the Colonial Secretary of the Straits Settlements in 1892, and was acting governor from 30 August 1893 to 1 February 1894.

Anglo-Ashanti War
In 1895, Maxwell was promoted to the governorship of the Gold Coast (now Ghana). Under his governorship the British declared war on the Asante Empire, the fourth Anglo-Ashanti War, known as the "Second Ashanti Expedition" in 1895.

An earlier Treaty signed by the Asantes in 1874, but whose terms were widely considered as absurd and unenforceable, was invoked by Maxwell. When the Asante King, Asantehene Agyeman Prempeh, could not meet the terms, Maxwell had him arrested, together with his mother, father, brother, uncles and a dozen advisors. They were later exiled to the Seychelles, not returning to the Gold Coast (now Ghana) until the 1920s.

Death and legacy

Suffering malaria, Maxwell died at sea off the Canary Islands and was buried at sea. He had married Lillias Grant Aberigh-Mackay in 1870, and left issue. At the Holy Trinity Cathedral, Accra in Ghana (formerly the Gold Coast) a memorial tablet to him exists. It reads:

"To the glory of God in memory of Sir William Maxwell KCMG Governor of the Gold Coast Colony, who sacrificed his life to his unselfish devotion to duty. Under his rule the Kingdom of Ashanti was brought under British control. In impaired health he undertook an expedition to the northern territories of the colony to extend peace and protection to slave raided tribes and contracted fever of which to the undying regret of all who knew him died on the voyage home. Born 5th August 1846. Died 14th December 1897. 'Neither count I my life dear unto myself so that I might finish my course.'"

Under the terms of his last will, he requested his niece to burn his private letters and diaries without examination, which was undertaken.

Awards and honours
Maxwell was invested with Companion of the Most Distinguished Order of St. Michael and St. George (CMG) in 1885 and Knight Commander of the Most Distinguished Order of St. Michael and St. George (KCMG) in 1896.

See also
 Maxwell, William Edward

References

1846 births
1897 deaths
History of Ghana
Knights Commander of the Order of St Michael and St George
Chief Secretaries of Singapore
Administrators in British Singapore
Governors of the Straits Settlements